Bandanaira Airport (also known as Banda Neira Airport)  is the airport in the Banda Islands of Maluku, Indonesia and one of the smallest airports in the country. The Banda Islands are a popular tourist destination for divers and snorkelers.

Most tourists come between February–May and September–December because that is when the weather is the best for snorkeling and diving.

Facilities 

This airport is a very small airport with few facilities. When planes take off or land, the airport sounds a siren to warn local residents to clear off the runway.

The largest aircraft that the runway can handle is a C-212.

Airlines and destinations

Ground transportation 

Local ground transport is available to and from the Banda airport either from private hire cars or motorcycle taxis called "ojek."

Incidents 

Between 1998 and 2008 there were four incidents at this airport. It is a tricky airport to land at due to the small runway, and the nearby volcano.
On June 5, 2006 Merpati Nusantara Airlines flight number 9971 was attempting to land at Bandanaira Airport, but skidded and veered off the runway. There was heavy rain at the time. The aircraft sustained damage to its wheels, wings and the fuselage was cracked, but there were no fatalities.

References

External links 

Bandanaira Airport - Indonesia Airport Global Website

Airports in Maluku